= Diabaté Fatoumata Guindo =

Malian politician

Diabaté Fatoumata Guindo (born June 28, 1973) is a politician in Mali.

She graduated from the École nationale d'administration of Bamako in 1996.

Guindo was Mali's minister in charge of relations with institutions and government spokesperson from 2007 to 2011.
